The Orange Senate District is one of 16 districts of the Vermont Senate. The current district plan is included in the redistricting and reapportionment plan developed by the Vermont General Assembly following the 2020 U.S. Census, which applies to legislatures elected in 2022, 2024, 2026, 2028, and 2030.

The Orange district includes most of Orange County.

As of the 2020 census, the state as a whole had a population of 643,077. As there are a total of 30 Senators, there were 21,436 residents per senator. As of 2022, the Orange Senate District had 21,954 residents.

As of the 2010 census, the state as a whole had a population of 625,741. As there are a total of 30 senators, there were 20,858 residents per senator. 

As of the 2000 census, the state as a whole had a population of 608,827. As there are a total of 30 Senators, there were 20,294 residents per senator.  The Orange District had a population of 19,852 in that same census.  The district is apportioned one senator. The district's 19,852 residents per senator is 2.18% below the state average.

District Senators

As of 2023
Mark A. MacDonald, Democrat

Towns in the Orange district

Orange County
Bradford
Brookfield
Chelsea
Corinth
Fairlee
Randolph
Strafford
Topsham
Tunbridge
Vershire
Washington
West Fairlee
Williamstown

Towns and cities in the Orange District, 2002–2012 elections

Orange County

 Braintree
 Brookfield
 Chelsea
 Corinth
 Randolph
 Strafford
 Thetford
 Tunbridge
 Vershire
 Washington
 Williamstown
 Orange

See also
Vermont Senate districts, 2012–2022
Vermont Senate districts, 2022–2032

References

External links

 Redistricting information from Vermont Legislature
 2002 and 2012 Redistricting information from Vermont Legislature
 Map of Vermont Senate districts and statistics (PDF) 2002–2012

Map of current Orange County Senate district

Vermont Senate districts